Mark James Markovich (born November 7, 1952) is an American former professional American football player who spent four seasons in the National Football League (NFL), where he played for the San Diego Chargers and Detroit Lions. Prior to his professional career, Markovich played at the collegiate level, while attending Penn State, where he provided blocking for Heisman Trophy winner, John Cappelletti.  Later in life, he owned a machine shop in pekin, il. A small LLC named Illinois machine and tool.

References

External links

1952 births
Living people
American football centers
American football offensive guards
Penn State Nittany Lions football players
San Diego Chargers players
Detroit Lions players
Players of American football from Pennsylvania
People from Latrobe, Pennsylvania